Anthony Trevor Cope was professor of Zulu at the University of Natal. He edited Harry Camp Lugg's translation of Magema Magwaza Fuze's Abantu Abamnyama (1922) into English which was published by the University of Natal Press in 1979 as The Black People and Whence They Came.

Selected publications
 Izibongo. Zulu praise-poems. Collected by James Stuart. Translated by Daniel Malcolm. Edited with introductions and annotations by Anthony Trevor Cope. Clarendon Press, Oxford, 1968.
 A Select Bibliography Relating to the Zulu People of Natal and Zululand. 1974.
 A Comprehensive Course in the Zulu Language. University of Natal, 1982.
 The Black People and Whence They Came. Magema Magwaza Fuze, translated by Harry Camp Lugg and edited by Anthony Trevor Cope. University of Natal Press, Pietermaritzburg, 1979. (Killie Campbell Africana library. Translation series, No. 1) 
 Zulu Phonology, Tonology and Tonal Grammar. 1986.
 UMamazane = Mamazane. R.H. Mthembu, translated into English by D.M. Mzolo and Anthony Trevor Cope. Solo Collective, Cowies Hill, South Africa, 2003.

References 

Academic staff of the University of Natal
Year of birth missing
Year of death missing
South African translators
Translators from Zulu
Zulu-language poets
Zulu-language writers